Joseph James Kinyoun (November 25, 1860 – February 14, 1919) was an American physician and the founder of the United States' Hygienic Laboratory, the predecessor of the National Institutes of Health.

Biography

Early life
Joseph James "Joe" Kinyoun was born November 25, 1860, in East Bend, North Carolina, the oldest of five children born to Elizabeth Ann Conrad and John Hendricks Kinyoun. His family settled in Post Oak, Missouri in 1866 after his house burned down during the Civil War. At the age of 16, he studied medicine with his father, John Hendricks Kinyoun, who was a general practitioner. His family joined a Baptist church.

Kinyoun was educated at St. Louis Medical College and graduated from Bellevue Medical College in 1882 with an M.D. degree. He did postdoctoral studies in pathology and bacteriology at the Carnegie Laboratory  where he became the first bacteriology student and studied cholera. Then he was a visiting scientist in Europe under Robert Koch. He was awarded a Ph.D. from Georgetown University in 1896.

Career
On October 4, 1886, Kinyoun began his career in the Marine Hospital Service at Staten Island Quarantine Station as an assistant surgeon, taking over the direction of the Laboratory of Hygiene in 1887. When the Surgeon General moved the laboratory from Staten Island to Washington, DC in 1891, he placed 26-year-old Kinyoun in charge of the nation's first federal bacteriology laboratory. His code name during his MHS career was Abutment.

Kinyoun's later career was spent in private companies and as a professor of bacteriology and pathology at George Washington University before becoming a bacteriologist for the District of Columbia Health Department, a position he held until his death. In 1909, Kinyoun served as president of the American Society for Microbiology.

In 1915, he developed the Kinyoun stain, a procedure used to stain acid-fast bacteria. It was a variation of a method developed by Robert Koch in 1882.

Hygienic Laboratory (1887–1896)
As the director of the Hygienic Laboratory, he researched on a plethora of different infectious diseases and their respective etiology and vaccine treatment while urging necessary hospital protocols and regulations for isolation of infected patients. Cholera, yellow fever, smallpox, and plague were the four main epidemic diseases that the laboratory investigated.

San Francisco Quarantine station
In 1899, Walter Wyman transferred Kinyoun to the San Francisco Quarantine station where he became head of the Marine Hospital Service in San Francisco. In March 1900 he was central to the discovery of the San Francisco plague of 1900–1904. He resigned his position in 1901 after allegations that his conclusive bubonic plague diagnoses were scaremongering. He was proven correct by independent testing and the appearance of further cases.

Marriage and children 
James and Susan Elizabeth "Lizzie" Perry married in 1883. The couple had at least five children: Bettie Kinyoun; Joseph Perry Kinyoun; Alice Kinyoun Houts; Conrad Kinyoun; and John Nathan Kinyoun. After his first child, Bettie died at the age of 3 from contracting diphtheria, he poured himself into his work and even set up a public diphtheria laboratory at Georgetown Medical School.

Death and afterward
Joseph Kinyoun died on February 14, 1919, in Washington, DC.

A collection of his papers is held at the National Library of Medicine.

San Francisco Plague

A Japanese ship, the S.S. Nippon Maru, arriving in San Francisco Bay in June 1899, had two plague deaths at sea, and there were two more cases of stowaways found dead in the bay, with postmortem cultures proving they had the plague. In New York in November 1899, the British ship J.W. Taylor brought three cases of plague from Brazil, but the cases were confined to the ship. The Japanese freighter S.S. Nanyo Maru arrived in Port Townsend, Washington, on January 30, 1900, with 3 deaths out of 17 cases of confirmed plague. In this atmosphere of grave danger, in January 1900, Kinyoun ordered all ships coming to San Francisco from China, Japan, Australia, and Hawaii to fly yellow flags to warn of possible plague on board. Many entrepreneurs and sailing men felt that this was bad for business, and unfair to ships that were free of plague. City promoters were confident that plague could not take hold, and they were unhappy with what they saw as Kinyoun's high-handed abuse of authority.

In January 1900, the four-masted steamship S.S. Australia laid anchor in the Port of San Francisco. The ship sailed between Honolulu and San Francisco regularly. Cargo from Honolulu unloaded at a dock near the outfall of Chinatown's sewers, may have allowed rats carrying the plague to leave the ship and transmit the infection. However, it is difficult to trace the infection to a single vessel. Wherever it came from, the disease was soon established in the cramped Chinese ghetto neighborhood; a sudden increase in dead rats was observed as local rats became infected.

Rumors of the plague's presence abounded in the city, quickly gaining the notice of authorities from MHS stationed on Angel Island in San Francisco Bay, including Chief Kinyoun.

On February 7, 1900, Wong Chut King, the owner of a lumber yard, died in his bed after suffering for four weeks. In the morning, the body was taken to a Chinese undertaker where it was examined by San Francisco police surgeon Frank P. Wilson on March 6, 1900. Wilson called for A.P. O'Brien, a city health department official, after finding suspiciously swollen lymph glands. Wilson and O'Brien then summoned Wilfred H. Kellogg, San Francisco's city bacteriologist, and the three men performed an autopsy as night closed. Looking through his microscope, Kellogg thought he saw plague bacilli. Late at night, Kellogg ran the suspicious samples of lymph fluid to Angel Island to be tested on animals in Kinyoun's better-equipped laboratory - an operation that would take at least four days.

On March 11, Kinyoun's lab presented its results. Two guinea pigs and one rat died after being exposed to samples from the first victim, proving the plague was indeed in Chinatown. On March 13, another lab animal, a monkey, died, who was exposed to the plague. All the dead animals tested positive for the plague bacteria.

Allied with powerful railroad and city business interests, California governor Henry Gage publicly denied the existence of any pestilent outbreak in San Francisco, fearing that any word of the bubonic plague's presence would deeply damage the city's and state's economy. Supportive newspapers, such as the Call, the Chronicle and the Bulletin, echoed Gage's denials, beginning what was to become an intense defamation campaign against quarantine officer Kinyoun.

The clash between Gage and federal authorities intensified. U.S. Surgeon General Walter Wyman instructed Kinyoun to place Chinatown under a second quarantine, as well as blocking all East Asians from entering state borders. Wyman also instructed Kinyoun to inoculate all persons of Asian heritage in Chinatown, using an experimental vaccine developed by Waldemar Haffkine, one known to have severe side effects.

Between 1901 and 1902, the plague outbreak continued to worsen. In a 1901 address to both houses of the California State Legislature, Gage accused federal authorities, particularly Kinyoun, of injecting plague bacteria into cadavers, falsifying evidence. In response to what he said to be massive scaremongering by the MHS, Gage pushed a censorship bill to gag any media reports of plague infection. The bill failed in the California State Legislature, yet laws to gag reports amongst the medical community succeeded in the passage and were signed into law by the governor. Also, $100,000 was allocated to a public campaign led by Gage to deny the plague's existence. Privately, however, Gage sent a special commission to Washington, D.C., consisting of Southern Pacific, newspaper and shipping lawyers to negotiate a settlement with the MHS, whereby the federal government would remove Kinyoun from San Francisco with the promise that the state would secretly cooperate with the MHS in stamping out the plague epidemic.

Despite the secret agreement allowing for Kinyoun's removal, Gage went back on his promise of assisting federal authorities and continued to obstruct their efforts for study and quarantine.

In his final speech, to the California State Legislature, in early January 1903, Gage blamed the federal government, in particular, Kinyoun, the MHS, and the San Francisco Board of Health for damaging the state's economy.

Awards
The National Institute of Allergy and Infectious Diseases' Joseph J. Kinyoun Memorial Lecture is named in his honor.

See also
Biologics Control Act
Kinyoun stain
List of Liberty ships (Je–L)

References

External links

 
PBS American Experience: Plague at the Golden Gate 

1860 births
1919 deaths
People from Johnson County, Texas
People from East Bend, North Carolina
American microbiologists
American bacteriologists
New York University Grossman School of Medicine alumni
20th-century American physicians
Directors of the National Institutes of Health
Cleveland administration personnel
Benjamin Harrison administration personnel
Marine Hospital Service personnel
McKinley administration personnel